Signs of Life is the eighth studio album by Steven Curtis Chapman. It was released on August 22, 1996, and later certified gold by the RIAA.

Track listing
All songs written by Steven Curtis Chapman, except where noted.
 "Lord of the Dance" (Chapman, Scotty Smith) – 5:21
 "Children of the Burning Heart" – 4:30
 "Signs of Life" – 4:28
 "The Walk" – 4:45
 "Let Us Pray" – 3:57
 "Free" – 6:43
 "Only Natural" – 3:35
 "Rubber Meets the Road" – 4:13
 "Celebrate You" – 4:31
 "What I Would Say" – 5:41
 "Land of Opportunity" (Chapman, Geoff Moore) – 4:53
 "Hold on to Jesus" (Chapman, James Isaac Elliot) – 3:52

Personnel 
 Steven Curtis Chapman – lead vocals, backing vocals, acoustic guitar (1–5, 7, 8, 9), dobro (1, 10, 12), slide acoustic guitar (1, 2), "bongo" dobro (1), electric guitar (2, 3), mandolin (2, 4), electric guitar solo (3, 8, 11), 12-string acoustic guitar (6), Roland VG-8 synth guitar (6, 7), 12-string guitar (7), Telecaster slide solo (7), lap steel guitar (9)
 Phil Madeira – Hammond B3 organ (1, 3, 5, 6, 11), National dobro (7), Wurlitzer electric piano (8)
 Shane Keister – Hammond B3 organ (2), Rhodes (3, 9), acoustic piano (6, 10, 11)
 Blair Masters – Wurlitzer electric piano (5), keyboards (9, 12)
 Gordon Kennedy – electric guitar (1–4, 6–11), acoustic guitar (5), 12-string guitar (11)
 Kenny Greenberg – electric guitar (1, 2, 5, 6, 8, 10, 11), acoustic guitar (3, 4, 7, 9)
 Jerry Douglas – lap steel guitar (4, 8)
 Leland Sklar – bass
 Chris McHugh – drums (1, 2, 7, 10, 11)
 Steve Brewster – drums (3, 6, 9, 12)
 Chad Cromwell – drums (4, 5, 8)
 Eric Darken – percussion
 Sam Bacco – percussion (10)
 Stuart Duncan – fiddle (1, 2)
 Tommy Morgan – harmonica (7)
 Carl Marsh – string arrangements (6, 10)
 The Nashville String Machine –  strings (6, 10)

Production 
 Brown Bannister – producer
 Steven Curtis Chapman – producer
 Peter York – executive producer
 Dan Raines – executive producer
 Steve Bishir – recording
 The Castle (Franklin, Tennessee) – recording location
 Ocean Way Recording (Hollywood, California) – recording location, mixing location 
 Eddie Miller – assistant engineer
 Hank Nirider – assistant engineer
 Jack Joseph Puig – mixing
 Jim Champagne – mix assistant
 Doug Sax – mastering 
 The Mastering Lab (Hollywood, California) – mastering location
 Traci Sterling Bishir – production manager
 Karen Philpott – creative direction
 Traci Daberko – design
 Joyce Revoir – additional design and production
 John Ragel – photography
 Johnny Villanueva – hair and make-up
 Ariana Lambert – stylist

Charts
Album - Billboard (North America)

Certifications

References

Steven Curtis Chapman albums
1996 albums
Sparrow Records albums